A list of Portuguese films that were first released in 2008.

See also
2008 in Portugal

References

2008
Lists of 2008 films by country or language
2008 in Portugal